Novy Zagan is a rural locality (a selo) in Mukhorshibirsky District, Republic of Buryatia, Russia. The population was 1,553 as of 2010. There are 20 streets.

Geography 
Novy Zagan is located 4 km southwest of Mukhorshibir (the district's administrative centre) by road. Stary Zagan is the nearest rural locality.

References 

Rural localities in Mukhorshibirsky District